Blue Labour is a British campaign group and political faction that seeks to promote blue-collar and culturally conservative values within the British Labour Party — particularly on immigration, crime, community spirit, and the European Union — while remaining committed to labour rights and left-wing economic policies. It seeks to represent a traditional working-class approach to Labour politics. Launched in 2009 as a counter to New Labour, the Blue Labour movement first rose to prominence after Labour's defeat in the 2010 general election, in which for the first time the party received fewer working-class votes than it did middle-class votes. The movement has influenced a handful of Labour MPs and frontbenchers; founder Maurice Glasman served as a close ally to Ed Miliband during his early years as Leader of the Opposition, before himself becoming a life peer in the House of Lords. The movement has also seen a resurgence of interest after the loss of red wall seats in the 2019 general election.

Blue Labour argues that the party lost touch with its base by embracing anti-patriotism in the face of Brexit and by undermining solidarity in local communities through bureaucratic collectivism, social agendas, and neoliberal economics. It argues that whilst postwar Old Labour had become too uncritical of state power, New Labour far worsened this with an uncritical view of global markets as well. The group further advocates a switch to local and democratic community management and provision of services, rather than relying on a top-down welfare state which it sees as excessively bureaucratic. Economically it is described as a "movement keen on guild socialism and continental corporatism". The Blue Labour position has been articulated in books such as Tangled Up in Blue (2011) of Rowenna Davis, Blue Labour: Forging a New Politics (2015) of Ian Geary and Adrian Pabst and Blue Labour: The Politics of the Common Good (2022) of Glasman himself. Additional elucidations on Blue Labour's ideas can be found in The Purple Book (2011) of Robert Philpot and Despised: Why the Modern Left Loathes the Working Class (2020) of Paul Embery.

Background 

The London Metropolitan University academic Maurice Glasman launched Blue Labour in April 2009 at a meeting in Conway Hall, Bloomsbury. In that meeting, he called for a "new politics of reciprocity, mutuality and solidarity" as an alternative to the post-1945 centralising approach of the Labour Party. The movement grew through a series of seminars held in University College, Oxford, and at London Metropolitan University in the aftermath of Labour's defeat in the 2010 general election.

A description of the movement is given by political analyst Bob Jessop, stating briefly that:

It has been suggested that the name Blue Labour came from a reaction to a comparable trend in the Conservative Party called Red Tory, but it was also chosen to suggest a hint of sadness, nostalgia and loss. The philosophical basis of Blue Labour is a combination of Aristotelianism (especially the concept of virtue) with the critique of market society developed by the Hungarian economist Karl Polanyi.

Key issues

Brexit and immigration 

Blue Labour sees the EU as a centralising force which limits the capacity for democratic decision-making about life in the UK. In particular, the idea of a 'single market' has been stretched too far as what began as a desire to facilitate trade across national boundaries has, in the name of competition policy, become a resistance to governments setting their own policies on areas like housing and financial services.

In July 2011, Glasman suggested that free movement of labour from the European Union should be renegotiated, causing a rift within the party. At a fringe meeting of the 2011 Labour Party Conference, Glasman reaffirmed some of these statements on immigration, argued for half of Britain's universities to be converted to vocational colleges and criticised the power of public-sector trade unions.

New Labour 

Glasman criticised the New Labour administration of Tony Blair for having an uncritical view of the market economy and that of Gordon Brown for being uncritical of both the market and the state. Chuka Umunna, the former Labour Shadow Business Secretary, who later left the Party, said in 2011 that Blue Labour "provides the seeds of national renewal".

Blue Labour argues that abstract concepts have held back the Labour Party from linking with the concerns of many voters, with its concern over material equality leading to an "obsession with the postcode lottery". As an alternative to those ideas, Blue Labour emphasises the importance of democratic engagement with more left wing economic policy combined with insisting that the Labour Party should seek to reinvigorate its relationships with communities across the nation, with an approach based on what Glasman describes as "family, faith, and flag".

Welfare 

Frank Field has been cited as an inspiration for Blue Labour.

In October 2013, Glasman delivered a speech to a Social Democratic Party of Germany event in Berlin. Praising the role of Ernest Bevin in developing the German economic model after the Second World War, he described the SPD as Labour's most important sister party outside the Commonwealth. He contrasted the British post-war consensus negatively with the German model, saying the latter was closer to the pre-war Labour ethos of solidarity than the collectivism of Attlee which he described as a continuation of wartime planning. Glasman concluded that pre-war Labour "improved the conditions of the working class precisely because it was not simply left-wing, it was also patriotic, conservative in relation to the constitution of Parliament and the monarchy, very strong in support of family life and contribution with a strong sense of place".

Reception 

Glasman was once described as former Labour leader Ed Miliband's "guru" by political commentator Matthew D'Ancona, who suggested that while the party may not adopt the full programme of Blue Labour (particularly its criticisms of consumerism and globalisation), the trend was helping "the Labour leader forge a language in which to express his championship of the NHS". Between 2010 and 2015, some commentators suggested that Blue Labour could be a potential alternative to David Cameron's Big Society, the "big idea" that might even "define Miliband's leadership".

The Conservative government of Boris Johnson changed policies toward Levelling Up the regions and raising working-class wages and skills partly by limiting migrant labour through Brexit, along with some more communitarian themes, and away from the small-state libertarian Singapore-on-Thames Brexit vision. Blue Labour reported an increase in followers after Johnson’s 2019 general election victory.

Labour leader Keir Starmer was also described as being influenced by Blue Labour and was praised as "a true conservative" by Glasman in an article on UnHerd. However, Glasman later became increasingly critical of Starmer's leadership, comparing Labour to the Whigs.

Key publications 
The Labour Tradition and the Politics of Paradox: The Oxford London Seminars, 2010–2011 is a collection of articles by Glasman, Stears and Jonathan Rutherford along with commentaries by many leading Labour figures including David Miliband, David Lammy, Hazel Blears, Jon Cruddas and James Purnell which looks at the way an attachment to neoliberalism and globalisation cut Labour off from some of its community traditions and ignored the importance of human relations.

The book has a supportive preface by former Labour Leader Ed Miliband, who states: 

The Purple Book: A Progressive Future For Labour, published in 2011, combines the views of several members of the Labour Party and is considered to be strongly supportive of several ideas of the ideas promoted by Blue Labour. It was edited by Robert Philpot and was explicitly endorsed by Glasman, Ed Miliband and David Miliband. The book was designed to bring together policy proposals for Labour but to delve into its revisionists roots before Old Labour looking at ideas stemming from the Christian Socialist Movement and R. H. Tawney, calling for an effective and active government not a big state. It also shares some themes from Tony Crosland's book on The Future of Socialism.

The book Tangled Up in Blue by Rowenna Davis explores the extent of Blue Labour's influence within the Labour Party and how Glasman's ideas influenced the leadership campaigns of both Ed Miliband and his brother David Miliband. It talks of how Glasman was initially working for David Miliband's campaign and put forward ideas on much more community devolution and the Movement for Change. It alleges that the living wage campaign masterminded by Ed Miliband's supporters was as a result of Glasman's involvement in Ed Miliband's leadership campaign at the same time. It also suggests Glasman used ties with Stewart Wood and Patrick Diamond to put forward Blue Labour ideas in Labour's 2010 manifesto such as community land trusts and a living wage as well as writing Gordon Brown's speech. The book further reveals alleged links between Glasman and Phillip Blond and similarities between their politics as well as how Glasman and Blond were co-operating together to promote their "radical conservatism" with both Labour and Conservative parties.

Blue Labour: Forging a New Politics, edited by Ian Greary and Adrian Pabst, was published in 2015. The book is another collection of essays on topics ranging from political philosophy to an analysis of European models of capitalism and to immigration in Britain from a theoretical position that is for the most part indebted to Catholic social teaching. Contributors include David Lammy, John Milbank and David Goodhart.

In 2022, Maurice Glasman himself illustrated his political positions in the book Blue Labour: The Politics of the Common Good.

Bibliography 

 Robert Philpot, The Purple Book: A Progressive Future For Labour, Biteback Publishing, 2011;
 Rowenna Davis, Tangled Up in Blue , Ruskin Publishing, 2011;
 Ian Greary and Adrian Pabst, Blue Labour: Forging a New Politics, I.B. Tauris, 2015;
 Paul Embery, Despised: Why the Modern Left Loathes the Working Class, Polity, 2020;
 Maurice Glasman, Blue Labour: The Politics of the Common Good, Polity, 2022.

See also 

 Christian democracy
 Christians on the Left
 Conservative Co-operative Movement
 Mondeo Man
 Progress (organisation)
 The Purple Book (Labour Party)
 Reagan Democrat

References

Further reading
 
 Blue Labour: rewriting Labour's history by Mike Gonzalez, Socialist Review (July–August 2011)

External links 
 

 
Labour Party (UK) factions
Political terms in the United Kingdom
Corporatism
Guilds